Dendrochori (Greek meaning tree village) may refer to several places in Greece:

Dendrochori, Kastoria, a village in the Kastoria regional unit
Dendrochori, Larissa, a village in the Larissa regional unit
Dendrochori, Trikala, a village in the Trikala regional unit
Dendrochori, Aetolia-Acarnania, a village in Aetolia-Acarnania